Aluvamkudi sri mahadeva kshethram is situated in the mountainous forests of Sabarimala, in the Ranni forest division panchayath of Gurunathanmannu, Thekkuthode,  Seethathode, Pathanamthitta District, India. It is a sacred temple, which is said to be created by Lord Parashuraman. It was found during deva prashnam that lord Sri Raman had conducted poojas in this kshethram. Archaeological dept has stated that the kshethram is approximately more than 2000 years old.

Aluvamkudi was abandoned and in a state of ruins when it was discovered by a hunter in the year 1940's. The people living in the panchayaths of gurunathanmannu, thekkuthode were the first to come and inspect the kshethram and conduct poojas.
Nowadays regular poojas are conducted on the first of every Malayalam month and special poojas and uthsavam is conducted on shiva rathri every year since its rediscovery.

References

External links
Facebook page

Hindu temples in Pathanamthitta district
Sabarimala